Jared Angira (born 21 November 1947) is a Kenyan poet. He has been called "the country's first truly significant poet".

Life 
Angira was born in 1947 in Siaya, Kenya. He studied commerce at the University of Nairobi from 1968 until 1971. He contributed to the first (1968) issue of the literary journal Busara, and was appointed its editor-in-chief in 1969. He also founded the Kenya Writers' Association.

Works 
 Juices, London (1970)
 Silent Voices, London (1972)
 Soft Corals, London (1973)
 "Experimental Writing", in Gurr and Calder, Writers in East Africa, 1974.

References 

Kenyan poets
Kenyan male writers
1947 births
Living people